David Ojabo (born May 17, 2000) is a Scottish-Nigerian American football outside linebacker for the Baltimore Ravens of the National Football League (NFL). He played college football at Michigan.

Early years
Ojabo was born in Port Harcourt, Nigeria, and moved to Aberdeen, Scotland with his family in 2007. At 17, he  moved to Blairstown, New Jersey, in the United States and began attending Blair Academy. He initially played basketball before switching to American football. Ojabo committed to the University of Michigan to play college football in part because the Michigan weather was similar to Scotland and made him feel at home.

College career
Ojabo did not play his first year at Michigan in 2019. As a sophomore in 2020, he played in six games and made one tackle. Ojabo took over as a starter in 2021. On January 4, 2022, he announced that he would forgo his senior year and enter the draft.

While performing on Pro Day at Michigan, Ojabo suffered a left ankle injury while performing a drill. It was later confirmed that he had suffered a torn Achilles.

Professional career

Ojabo was drafted by the Baltimore Ravens in the second round, 45th overall, of the 2022 NFL Draft. He was placed on injured reserve on August 31, 2022 as he continued to recover from the Achilles injury he suffered in March. He was activated on November 1.

References

External links
 Baltimore Ravens bio
 Michigan Wolverines bio

2000 births
Living people
American football defensive ends
American football linebackers
Baltimore Ravens players
Michigan Wolverines football players
Blair Academy alumni
Sportspeople from Aberdeen
Sportspeople from Port Harcourt
Nigerian players of American football
Scottish players of American football